Sericogaster is a monotypic genus of bees belonging to the family Colletidae. The only species is Sericogaster fasciata.

The species is found in Australia.

References

Colletidae
Monotypic Hymenoptera genera